Anzac Station tram stop is a major interchange on the Melbourne tram network. It is located on St Kilda Road south of Domain Road, adjacent to Kings Domain. It is one of the busiest interchanges on the system, being used by eight tram routes. It opened in December 2022 on top of Anzac railway station as a replacement for Domain Interchange that was demolished in 2018 to allow the Metro Tunnel to be built.

Routes
The following routes operates through Anzac Station:

References

External links

ANZAC (Australia)
Tram stops in Melbourne
Transport infrastructure completed in 2022
2022 establishments in Australia